SS E.M. Clark was an American merchant ship of the first half of the 20th century. A steam tanker, she was laid down in 1921 at the Federal Shipbuilding Company in Kearny, New Jersey, and entered service with Imperial Oil Ltd of Vancouver, British Columbia as Victolite. She was sold to Standard Oil of New Jersey and New York in 1926, and renamed E.M. Clark. She was sunk off Cape Hatteras, North Carolina on March 18, 1942, by the German U-boat U-124.

The shipwreck was listed on the National Register of Historic Places in 2013.

See also
National Register of Historic Places listings in Dare County, North Carolina
List of shipwrecks of North Carolina

References

Ships built in Kearny, New Jersey
World War II merchant ships of the United States
Maritime incidents in March 1942
Ships sunk by German submarines in World War II
World War II shipwrecks in the Atlantic Ocean
Shipwrecks of the Carolina coast
Archaeological sites on the National Register of Historic Places in North Carolina
Shipwrecks on the National Register of Historic Places in North Carolina
Buildings and structures in Dare County, North Carolina
National Register of Historic Places in Dare County, North Carolina
World War II on the National Register of Historic Places